Don Watts is an Australian Paralympic swimming silver medalist.

He competed at the 1962 Commonwealth Paraplegic Games in Perth, Western Australia. In swimming, he won a silver medal in the Men's 50 m Breaststroke Class D. In table tennis, he won a silver medal in the Men's Doubles Class C. At the 1968 Tel Aviv Games, he competed in two swimming events and won a silver medal in the Men's 50 m Breaststroke Class 3. He also competed in table tennis.

References 

Male Paralympic swimmers of Australia
Paralympic table tennis players of Australia
Swimmers at the 1968 Summer Paralympics
Table tennis players at the 1968 Summer Paralympics
Paralympic silver medalists for Australia
Living people
Year of birth missing (living people)
Medalists at the 1968 Summer Paralympics
Paralympic medalists in swimming
Australian male breaststroke swimmers